Jan de Witte O.P. (1475–1540), also Joannes Albus in Latin and Juan de Witte Hoos or Juan de Ubite in some Spanish sources, was a Flemish renaissance humanist and Roman Catholic prelate who served as the first Bishop of Cuba (1518–1525).

Biography
Jan de Witte was the son of Maria Hoose and the merchant Jan de Witte, lord of Ruddervoorde, who was mayor of Bruges in 1473. The De Witte family traded with Spain and Jan was sent to Valladolid for training, where he ended up being ordained a priest in the Order of Preachers. In 1506 he was called back to Flanders, probably Mechelen, to be the teacher Spanish and Dutch for the children of Philip I of Castile and Joanna of Castile.

On 15 May 1514, he was appointed during the papacy of Pope Leo X as Titular Bishop of Selymbria near Constantinople and on 11 February 1517 as Bishop of Baracoa on Cuba. On 28 April 1522, during the papacy of Pope Adrian VI, this diocese was renamed and his title was changed to  Bishop of Santiago de Cuba. He served in Santiago de Cuba until his resignation on 4 April 1525. He died there on 18 September 1540 In his will he established a chair of literature and a chair of theology, named the "Cuba foundation".

References

External links and additional sources
 (for Chronology of Bishops)  
 (for Chronology of Bishops) 

1475 births
1540 deaths
16th-century Roman Catholic bishops in Cuba
Bishops appointed by Pope Leo X
Bishops appointed by Pope Adrian VI
Dominican bishops
Flemish Dominicans
Roman Catholic priests of the Habsburg Netherlands
Clergy from Bruges
Roman Catholic bishops of Santiago de Cuba